Néons-sur-Creuse (literally Néons on Creuse) is a commune in the Indre department in central France.

Geography
The commune is located in the parc naturel régional de la Brenne.

The river Creuse forms all of the commune's eastern border; the river Gartempe forms part of its western border.

Population

See also
Communes of the Indre department

References

Communes of Indre